Calvin Washington Stamp (25 June 1958 – 30 December 2018) was a Jamaican weightlifter. He competed at the 1984 Summer Olympics and the 1988 Summer Olympics.

On 30 December 2018, he died in a car accident in DeKalb County, Georgia.

Major results

References

External links
 

1958 births
2018 deaths
Jamaican male weightlifters
Olympic weightlifters of Jamaica
Weightlifters at the 1984 Summer Olympics
Weightlifters at the 1988 Summer Olympics
Place of birth missing
Pan American Games medalists in weightlifting
Pan American Games bronze medalists for Jamaica
Road incident deaths in Georgia (U.S. state)
Weightlifters at the 1983 Pan American Games
Weightlifters at the 1990 Commonwealth Games
Commonwealth Games competitors for Jamaica
20th-century Jamaican people
21st-century Jamaican people